NS37, NS 37, NS-37, NS.37, or variation, may refer to:

 Nudelman-Suranov NS-37, a 37mm Soviet aircraft autocannon
 Lunenburg West (constituency N.S. 37), Nova Scotia, Canada; a provincial electoral district
 Kanuni (drillship), pennant NS37, an ultra-deep-water drillship
 New Penguin Shakespeare volume 37

See also

 NS (disambiguation)
 37 (disambiguation)